was the post of the chiefs of the Kamakura shogunate in Kyoto whose agency, the , kept responsibility for security in Kinai and judicial affairs on western Japan, and negotiated with the imperial court.  Despite keeping security, the Rokuhara were also a sort of secret police and widely feared.

Rokuhara Tandai was set up after the Jōkyū Incident in 1221. Kitakata was higher-ranking than Minamikata. Like shikken and rensho, both posts were monopolized by the Hōjō clan. The agency was destroyed with the fall of Kamakura shogunate in 1333.

List of Rokuhara Tandai

Kitakata
Hōjō Yasutoki (r. 1221–1224)
Hōjō Tokiuji (r. 1224–1230)
Hōjō Shigetoki (r. 1230–1247)
Hōjō Nagatoki (r. 1247–1256)
Hōjō Tokimochi (r. 1256–1270)
Hōjō Yoshimune (r. 1271–1276)
Hōjō Tokimura (r. 1277–1287)
Hōjō Kanetoki (r. 1287–1293)
Hōjō Hisatoki (r. 1293–1297)
Hōjō Munekata (r. 1297–1300)
Hōjō Mototoki (r. 1301–1303)
Hōjō Tokinori (r. 1303–1307)
Hōjō Sadaaki (r. 1311–1314)
Hōjō Tokiatsu (r. 1315–1320)
Hōjō Norisada (r. 1321–1330)
Hōjō Nakatoki (r. 1330–1333)

Minamikata
Hōjō Tokifusa (r. 1221–1225)
Hōjō Tokimori (r. 1224–1242)
Hōjō Tokisuke (r. 1264–1272)
Hōjō Tokikuni (r. 1277–1284)
Hōjō Kanetoki (r. 1284–1287)
Hōjō Morifusa (r. 1288–1297)
Hōjō Munenobu (r. 1297–1302)
Hōjō Sadaaki (r. 1302–1308)
Hōjō Sadafusa (r. 1308–1309)
Hōjō Tokiatsu (r. 1311–1315)
Hōjō Koresada (r. 1315–1324)
Hōjō Sadayuki (r. 1324–1330)
Hōjō Tokimasu (r. 1330–1333)

References

Government of feudal Japan
Medieval spies
Intelligence agencies